Konstantinos Pallis (1871–1941) was a staff officer of the Hellenic Army, who served as chief of staff of the Army of Asia Minor in 1920–22, and as Chief of the Hellenic Army General Staff during the Greco-Italian War of 1940–41.

Life 
Born in Athens on 5 March 1871, Pallis entered the Hellenic Military Academy and graduated on 31 July 1883 as an Artillery 2nd Lieutenant. During the Greco-Turkish War of 1897 he served in the expeditionary corps sent to Crete under Colonel Timoleon Vassos.

In 1904 he became a lieutenant, followed by promotions to captain II class (1910) and I class (1911). During the Balkan Wars of 1912–13 he served as a staff officer in the General Headquarters of the Crown Prince, and later King, Constantine I of Greece. Pallis was promoted to major in 1913, lieutenant colonel in 1915, and colonel in 1917. In 1915–17 he was head of the Army Staff Service's 3rd Directorate, responsible for training and history.

Due to his monarchist views, he was dismissed from the army in 1917–20, but after the electoral victory of the pro-monarchist United Opposition in November 1920, he was recalled to active service and appointed chief of staff to the Army of Asia Minor, under Lieutenant General Anastasios Papoulas. In 1921 he was promoted to major general. He remained in his post until Papoulas' dismissal on 23 May 1922, after which he too requested to be reassigned. Following the Turkish offensive and the dismissal of Papoulas' successor Georgios Hatzianestis, Pallis was reinstated as chief of staff of the rapidly disintegrating Army of Asia Minor, under Lt. General Georgios Polymenakos, on 26 August.

He retired from service on 28 November 1923. In 1927, the Special Military Council decided his re-activation and promotion to lieutenant general, but Pallis declined and resumed his retirement.

On 7 December 1935, he was appointed as Minister Governor-General of Macedonia in the cabinet of Konstantinos Demertzis,  a post he continued to hold under Demertzis' successor, Ioannis Metaxas, until his resignation on 2 June 1936.

Upon the outbreak of the Greco-Italian War on 28 October 1940, Pallis was recalled to active service and placed Chief of the Field Army General Staff, a position he held until February 1941. 

He died in the same year, at the age of 70.

References

1871 births
1941 deaths
Military personnel from Athens
20th-century Greek people
Chiefs of the Hellenic Army General Staff
Hellenic Army lieutenant generals
Greek military personnel of the Balkan Wars
Greek military personnel of the Greco-Turkish War (1897)
Greek military personnel of the Greco-Turkish War (1919–1922)
Greek military personnel of World War II
Governors-General of Macedonia